Heseltine is an English surname, and may refer to:

 Annabel Heseltine (born 1960), British journalist
 Bill Heseltine, Australian cyclist
 Catherine Heseltine (born 1978), British Muslim activist
 Christopher Heseltine (1869–1944), English cricketer
 F. J. Heseltine, English cricketer
 James Heseltine (c.1690–1763), English organist
 John Postle Heseltine (1843–1929), British painter and art collector
Mary Jermyn Heseltine (1910–2002) Australian pathologist
 Michael Heseltine (born 1933), British politician
 Michael Heseltine (civil servant) (1886–1952), English civil servant 
 Nigel Heseltine (1916–1995), Welsh writer
 Peter Heseltine (born 1965), English cricketer
 Philip Heseltine, British composer known as Peter Warlock (1894–1930)
 Philip Heseltine (born 1960), English cricketer
 S. R. Heseltine (1849–1920), riverboat captain and horse racing official in South Australia
 Wayne Heseltine, English footballer
 William Heseltine (born 1930), former Private Secretary to Queen Elizabeth II

See also
 Haseltine
 Heselton
 Hazeldine (disambiguation)

English-language surnames